María Elvia Amaya Araujo (27 February 1954 – 8 September 2012) was a Mexican psychologist, philanthropist, and politician affiliated with the PRI. She served as Deputy of the LXII Legislature of the Mexican Congress representing Baja California.

She was the daughter of Sergio Amaya Brondo and María Elvia Araujo Montaño. She was married to Jorge Hank Rhon, municipal president of Tijuana from 2004 to 2007 and candidate to the government of Baja California. Hank Rhon is a prominent Mexican businessman. They had nine children: Alejandro, Mara, Rodrigo, Ana Guadalupe, Carlos Andrés, José Mario, María Guadalupe, Nirvana and Jorge Carlos.

She died on 8 September 2012 due to multiple myeloma.

References

1954 births
2012 deaths
People from Mexicali
Women members of the Chamber of Deputies (Mexico)
Institutional Revolutionary Party politicians
Deaths from multiple myeloma
21st-century Mexican politicians
21st-century Mexican women politicians
Politicians from Baja California
Mexican psychologists
Mexican women psychologists
Deaths from cancer in Mexico
Members of the Chamber of Deputies (Mexico) for Baja California